Sekolah Tuanku Abdul Rahman (abbreviated STAR) is a premier, all-boys fully residential school in Malaysia funded by the Government of Malaysia. Named after the first Yang di-Pertuan Agong (King) of the Federation of Malaya, Almarhum Seri Paduka Baginda Tuanku Abdul Rahman ibni Almarhum Tuanku Muhammad, it is located in Ipoh, Perak. The school started at an army camp in Baeza Avenue (now known as Jalan Hospital). Formerly known as Malay Secondary School, the school was built by the Malayan government in 1957. In 2011,the school was awarded with the Sekolah Berprestasi Tinggi or High Performance School title, a title awarded to schools in Malaysia that have met stringent criteria including academic achievement, strength of alumni, international recognition, network and linkages.

The beginning 
In 1950s, a few hundred promising rural children who had completed their Malay primary level education, and their placement in a few selected schools in Ipoh, Pulau Pinang, Kuala Lipis, Kuala Lumpur and Johor Bahru were chosen to be the pioneer students of the first three Malay residential secondary schools for rural children. They were planned in Ipoh, Tg. Malim, and Melaka. These schools were later known as Sekolah Tuanku Abd Rahman (STAR), Ipoh; Sekolah Dato' Abdul Razak (SDAR), Tg. Malim; and Sekolah Tun Fatimah (STF), Melaka.

In 1957, 360 of these 13–15-year-old children were placed in five old wooden military barracks vacated by the Malay Regiments, at what was then known as Baeza Avenue, Ashby Road, Ipoh (the site where Sekolah Kebangsaan Sri Kinta, Jalan Hospital, Ipoh, now stands).

Initially, the military barracks; with twelve wooden classrooms, became the new students' school, known as the Malay Secondary School (MSS), Ipoh. Classrooms, sleeping quarters (dormitories), dining hall etc. were all cramped in the barracks within barbed wire fences surrounding the 4-acre site. There was no space for the school to have a hall, or a playing computer.

History

The school started on 13 January 1957, with the admission of 200 of these children into Form One. In March, another 160 joined the school to join the Remove Class. A year in what was called “Remove Class” was deemed necessary for every intake of students at the start. The purpose was to equip the students with sufficient command of English language that would enable them to commence their secondary education with English as the medium of instruction. Hence around 60-70% of the time in Remove Class was devoted to the teaching and learning of English Language. The Remove Class ceased to exist when Bahasa Malaysia was made the sole medium of instruction in secondary schools in the country in the early 1970s.

Teaching was done by a group of 15 teachers led by En Hamdan b Sheikh Tahir (Allahyarham Tun Hamdan b Sheikh Tahir) as the first principal. Classes were conducted following the standard curriculum offered in the English medium secondary schools of the day. Associations such as the English and Malay Literary and Debating societies were set up A Boy Scout group, a Red Cross Society and a St. John Ambulance Association group were also formed. The lack of a school hall did not deter the boys from staging a school play for the town folks using another school hall at ACS Ipoh. The absence of a school field of their own did not prevent the boys from playing soccer, hockey and rugby two days a week on “borrowed” ground at the Anderson School new field. The tradition of having Annual School Sports Day was also started in the first year when on 12 July 1957, using the Anderson School field, the school held its first School Sports Day. 

On 2 January 1957, MSS operated from a temporary site (a former British Army Barrack) at Baeza Avenue, Off Ashby Road, Ipoh, Perak with 360 students. The first headmaster of the school was Tuan Hj. Hamdan Bin Sheikh Tahir. In 6 January 1958, the school moved to its present site along Tiger Lane, Ipoh (now Jalan Sultan Azlan Shah). On 14 May 1958, the official opening and renaming of the school by the first Prime Minister of Federation Of Malaya, Tunku Abdul Rahman Putra Al-Haj. The school is now known as Sekolah Tuanku Abdul Rahman, named after the first Yang Di Pertuan Agong of the Federation, His Majesty Tuanku Abdul Rahman. On 23 September 1958, royal Visit by His Majesty Yang Di Pertuan Agong Tuanku Abdul Rahman. In November 1959, the first batch of students sat the Lower Certificate of Education examination. In January 1960, Form Four classes started. In November 1961, STAR's first batch of candidates (155) sat for the combined Cambridge Overseas School Certificate/Federation of Malaya Certificate examinations. In January 1962, Form Six Classes started. In November 1963, STAR's first batch of Upper Six Classes (Arts and Science) sat for the Overseas Higher School Certificate examination. In January 1964, female students were admitted (STAR is a boys’ residential school) to the school joining Lower Six Science class. In January 1965, 13 girls were admitted to the school entering Lower Six classes.

In 1975, school stopped the enrolment of pupils into Remove Classes. In January 1981, enrolment of first 2nd generation Starian. Alimin Ismadi, the son of Ismail Salleh (second batch) joined Form One. In June 1981, official launch of Kelas Matrikulasi Sains with Universiti Sains Malaysia. In 1982, Silver Jubilee. On 15 August 1982, Hussein Salleh (first batch) returned to the school as Principal.

Rugby 

STAR was Perak state rugby champion for many years, culminating in winning the Mori Trophy in 1968. Many of the players went on to don state and national colours. The rugby's team battlecry of "Cobra tasha, Cobra tasha, shina shina STAR" is the embodiment of the school's spirit. In 2016, Cobratasha had become the Champion of Malaysia Super Six School Rugby. They are also one of the greatest rugby team among Malaysian schools.

Hockey 

Anaconda is the STAR's hockey team. They had been one of the excellent and strongest hockey team among Sekolah Berasrama Penuh and Schools in Malaysia. They had been crowned as the champion in many hockey tournaments between schools around Malaysia.

Debate 
All- STAR Debating Union consists of two clubs which is Keluarga Debat Bahasa Melayu and English Debate Club And Society. They are one of the highly recognised Debating Team in Sekolah Berasrama Penuh. The English Debate Club And Society which is the English debating club of STAR Ipoh had joined and won many national and international debate competitions. The Keluarga Debat Bahasa Melayu is the Malay debating club of STAR Ipoh had won in numerous competitions in Malaysia. The All-STAR Debating Union IS one of the most successful and excellent clubs in the school.

Events

STAR Old Boys Weekend

STAR Old Boys Weekend (OBW) is an annual event organised by the school alumni which called as STAR Old Boys Association (STAROBA). During this event, all oldboys will come to this event to meet their batch mates and members during their study at the school. This event is held at the school.

Notable alumni

The alumni or old boys of the school are affiliated to STAROBA, the Sekolah Tuanku Abdul Rahman Old Boys’ Association. The society is involved in activities like Old Boys Weekend and other sporting events involving alumni of other schools. The current president of the association is Faizal Othman.

Notable alumni include:

 Mohd Redzuan Md Yusof - Former Minister of Entrepreneur Development
 Md Raus Sharif - Former Chief Justice of Malaysia
 Awang Adek Hussin - Former Ambassador of Malaysia to the United States of America and Former Deputy Ministry of Finance (Malaysia)
 Hamzah Zainuddin - Former Deputy Minister of Ministry of Plantation Industries and Commodities (Malaysia)
 Idris Jusoh - Former Terengganu chief minister, Former Chairman of MARA (Majlis Amanah Rakyat), Former Education and Higher Learning Minister II
 Annuar Musa - Former Minister of Youth and Sports
 Mohd Zaid Ibrahim - Prominent Malaysian lawyer, Former Minister in the Prime Minister's Department in charge of legal affairs and judicial reforms
 Abdul Samad Alias - Former President of the Malaysian Institute of Certified Public Accountants, President of the Malaysian Institute of Accountants
 Abdullah Hassan - Malay Language Professor
 Zainal Kling - Emeritus Professor, Former President of Malaysian Social Science Association and Head of History and Sociocultural Cluster for Majlis Profesor Negara (MPN)
 Jamal Jamaluddin- Former Radio Announcers (SINAR FM & ERA FM)

References

External links
 https://staroba.org.my
 https://www.staripoh.edu.my

Educational institutions established in 1957
1957 establishments in Malaya
Boys' schools in Malaysia